Events in the year 1895 in Bulgaria.

Incumbents

Events 

 The Macedonian Secret Revolutionary Committee (MSRC) was founded in Plovdiv.

Deaths 

 18 July – Stefan Stambolov, former Prime Minister and regent of Bulgaria (born 1854)

References 

 
1890s in Bulgaria
Years of the 20th century in Bulgaria
Bulgaria
Bulgaria